Surangani Visaka Ellawala (1939 – 14 March 2016) was a Sri Lankan politician who was a member of parliament (2000-2001) and served as the 9th Governor of the Central Province (2015-2016).

She was the wife of Nanda Ellawala, who was the member of parliament for Ratnapura, (1970-1977, 1982-1994) and the mother of Nalanda Ellawala, who succeeded his father as the member of parliament for Ratnapura (1994-1997).

In 1999 she contested the 3rd Sabaragamuwa Provincial Council election as a People's Alliance candidate and was successful, winning with a landslide majority of 54,000 preferential votes, the highest number of preferential votes at the election. Following which she was appointed Minister of Social Services, Probation, Culture, Housing and Cooperatives.

She then ran at the 2000 Sri Lankan parliamentary elections in the Ratnapura electorate as a People's Alliance candidate in the Ratnapura District. She received 54,517 votes, the fifth highest and was elected as one of the ten members for the seat. She failed to get re-elected at the 2001 Sri Lankan parliamentary election and chose not to run in the 2004 Sri Lankan parliamentary elections.

She was appointed as the Governor of the Central Province on 27 January 2015.

Ellawala died on 14 March 2016 while serving as the Central Province Governor.

References

1939 births
2016 deaths
Governors of Central Province, Sri Lanka
Sri Lankan Buddhists
Women legislators in Sri Lanka
Members of the 11th Parliament of Sri Lanka
21st-century Sri Lankan politicians
21st-century Sri Lankan women politicians
Sinhalese politicians
Women provincial governors of Sri Lanka